National Geographic is a subscription television network of National Geographic Partners, which is owned jointly by The Walt Disney Company (73%) and the National Geographic Society (27%).

National Geographic may also refer to:
 National Geographic (Asian TV channel)
 National Geographic (American TV channel)
 National Geographic (Australian and New Zealand TV channel)
 National Geographic (British and Irish TV channel)
 National Geographic (Canadian TV channel)
 National Geographic (Dutch TV channel)
 National Geographic (French TV channel)
 National Geographic (German TV channel)
 National Geographic (Greek TV channel)
 National Geographic (Indian TV channel)
 National Geographic (Portuguese TV channel)
 National Geographic (Scandinavian TV channel)
 National Geographic (South Korean TV channel)
 National Geographic Abu Dhabi
 Nat Geo Wild
 Nat Geo Wild (Canadian TV channel)
 National Geographic Wild (European TV channel)
 Nat Geo Music
 Nat Geo People
 Nat Geo Kids Abu Dhabi
 Nat Geo Kids (Brazilian TV channel)
 Nat Geo Kids (Latin American TV channel)
 Nat Geo Tamil
 Nat Geo Telugu
 National Geographic Farsi

See also
 National Geographic (disambiguation)